Rawsonville  is an unincorporated community on the boundary of Washtenaw and Wayne County in the U.S. state of Michigan.  The historic community of Rawsonville lies mostly under Belleville Lake, which is an artificial reservoir created in 1925 when the Eastern Michigan Edison Company built the French Landing Dam and Powerhouse along the Huron River.

Rawsonville was dedicated as a Michigan State Historic Site on October 27, 1983.

History 
In 1800, the first settler Henry Snow came to this location which was original called Snow's Landing. In 1825, Amariah Rawson and his family arrived at the village.The community plat, as Michigan City by Amariah Rawson and two others, was filed on January 7, 1836. After a group of neighbors petitioned the State Legislature asking that the name be changed to Rawsonville, on March 22, 1839, the act formally changing the name to Rawsonville was passed. On November 14, 1838, The Van Buren post office was moved to Rawsonville and assumed that name.

By the Civil War era, the village was doing well with grist mill, saw mill, a stove factory, and a wagon maker. With the building of the railroad, the community was bypassed hurting the industries there.

On October 25, 1895, the post office was closed. It reopened on November 20, 1895, only to close again on February 28, 1902. By 1900, there were few residents. In 1925, the Detroit Edison company began constructing the French Landing hydroelectric dam on the Huron River and the village of Rawsonville became completely submerged in the new Belleville Lake. The only visual sign that a village was there at one time is the historical marker in front of the McDonald's on Rawsonville Road and across from Grove Road.

References 

Old Rawsonville Village
Old Rawsonville Village
Huron River (Michigan)
Unincorporated communities in Washtenaw County, Michigan
Unincorporated communities in Wayne County, Michigan
Former villages in Michigan